is a Japanese actor and tarento. He graduated from the Department of Moving Images and Performing Arts in the Faculty of Art and Communication at Tama Art University. He is represented with Cube.

Biography
In 2000, Katō debuted in the variety show Appare Sanma Dai Sensei at the age of ten.

Later on he played in the film Detroit Metal City and played supporting roles in dramas such as Gakkō no Kaidan, Omoni Naitemasu, and Kaitō Yamaneko.

Filmography

Television

Animations

Films

Stage

Variety programmes

Regular programmes

Special programmes

Advertisements

Music videos

Others

References

External links
 
 Official profile

Japanese male stage actors
Japanese television personalities
Japanese male child actors
People from Shizuoka (city)
1990 births
Living people
Actors from Shizuoka Prefecture
Tama Art University alumni